Isma'ilism is a branch or sub-sect of Shia Islam.

Ismaili or the variant Ismaily may also refer to:

Ismaili
Ismaili (surname), individuals with the surname or patronymic
Nizari Isma'ilism or al-Nizāriyyūn, a branch of the Ismaili Shi'i Muslims after the Twelvers
Ismāʻīlī Constitution, a universal constitution governing the Ismaili Shia Muslims
Ismaili Centre, a series of centres mainly belonging to Ismaili trends
Ismaili Centre, Dushanbe, Tajikistan
Ismaili Centre, London
Ismaili Centre, Toronto, Ontario, Canada
The Ismaili Centre, Burnaby, near Vancouver, British Columbia, Canada
The Ismaili Centre, Lisbon
Ismaili railway station, railway station located in Pakistan

Ismaily
Ismaily, a Brazilian footballer
Ismaily SC, an Egyptian sports club

See also
Nizari Ismaili state, also called the Alamut State, a Shia Nizari Ismaili state founded by the Order of Assassins under Hassan-i Sabbah
 
 Esmaili (disambiguation), a Persian-language  variant of Ismaili